Mary Ann Camberton Shadd Cary (October 9, 1823 – June 5, 1893) was an American-Canadian anti-slavery activist, journalist, publisher, teacher, and lawyer. She was the first black woman publisher in North America and the first woman publisher in Canada. She was also the second black woman to attend law school in the US. Mary Shadd edited The Provincial Freeman, established in 1853. Published weekly in southern Ontario, it advocated equality, integration and self-education for black people in Canada and the United States.

Mary's family was involved in the Underground Railroad assisting those fleeing slavery.  After the passage of the Fugitive Slave Act of 1850, her family relocated to Canada. She returned to the United States during the American Civil War where she recruited soldiers for the Union. Self taught, Mary went to Howard University Law School, and continued advocacy for civil rights for African Americans and women for the rest of her life.

Early life
Mary Ann Shadd was born in Wilmington, Delaware, on October 9, 1823, the eldest of 13 children to Abraham Doras Shadd (1801–1882) and Harriet Burton Parnell, who were free African-Americans. Abraham D. Shadd was a grandson of Hans Schad, alias John Shadd, a native of Hesse-Cassel who had entered the United States serving as a Hessian soldier with the British Army during the French and Indian War. Hans Schad was wounded and left in the care of two African-American women, mother and daughter, both named Elizabeth Jackson. The Hessian soldier and the daughter were married in January 1756 and their first son was born six months later.

A. D. Shadd was the son of Jeremiah Shadd, John's younger son, who was a Wilmington butcher. Abraham Shadd was trained as a shoemaker and had a shop in Wilmington and later in the nearby town of West Chester, Pennsylvania. In both places he was active as a conductor on the Underground Railroad and in other civil rights activities, being an active member of the American Anti-Slavery Society, and, in 1833, named President of the National Convention for the Improvement of Free People of Colour in Philadelphia.

Growing up, her family's home frequently served as a refuge for fugitive slaves; however, when it became illegal to educate African-American children in the state of Delaware, the Shadd family moved to Pennsylvania, where Mary attended a Quaker Boarding School (despite being raised Catholic). In 1840, after being away at school, Shadd returned to East Chester and established a school for black children. She also later taught in Norristown, Pennsylvania, and New York City.

Three years after the passage of the Fugitive Slave Act of 1850, A. D. Shadd moved his family to the United Canadas (Canada West), settling in North Buxton, Ontario. In 1858, he became one of the first black men to be elected to political office in Canada, when he was elected to the position of Counsellor of Raleigh Township, Ontario.

Social activism

In 1848, Frederick Douglass asked readers in his newspaper,  The North Star, to offer their suggestions on what could be done to improve life for African-Americans. Shadd, then only 25 years of age, wrote to him to say, "We should do more and talk less." She expressed her frustration with the many conventions that had been held to that date, such as those attended by her father, where speeches were made and resolutions passed about the evils of slavery and the need for justice for African-Americans. Yet little tangible improvement had resulted.  Douglass published her letter in his paper.

When the Fugitive Slave Law of 1850 in the United States threatened to return free northern blacks and escaped slaves into bondage, Shadd and her brother Isaac Shadd moved to Canada, and settled in Windsor, Ontario, across the border from Detroit, where Shad's efforts to create free black settlements in Canada first began.

While in Windsor, she founded a racially integrated school with the support of the American Missionary Association. Public education in Ontario was not open to black students at the time. Shadd offered daytime classes for children and youth, and evening classes for adults.

An advocate for emigration, in 1852, Shadd published a pamphlet entitled A Plea for Emigration; or Notes of Canada West, in Its Moral, Social and Political Aspect: with Suggestions respecting Mexico, West Indies and Vancouver's Island for the Information of Colored Emigrants. The pamphlet discussed the benefits of emigration, as well as the opportunities for blacks in the area.

The Provincial Freeman 
In 1853, Shadd founded an anti-slavery paper, called  The Provincial Freeman.  The paper's slogan was "Devoted to antislavery, temperance and general literature." It was published weekly and the first issue was published in Toronto, Ontario, on March 24, 1853. It ran for four years before financial challenges forced the paper to fold.

Shadd was aware that her name would affect the number of people reading it, because of the gender expectations of 19th-century society.  Therefore, she persuaded Samuel Ringgold Ward, a black abolitionist who published several abolitionist newspapers, including Impartial Citizen, to help her publish it.  She also enlisted the help of Rev. Alexander McArthur, a white clergyman. Their names were featured on the masthead, but Shadd was involved in all aspects of the paper.

Isaac Shadd, Mary Ann Shadd's brother, managed the daily business affairs of the newspaper.  Isaac was a committed abolitionist, and would later host gatherings to plan the raid on Harper's Ferry at his home.

Shadd traveled widely in Canada and the United States to increase subscription to the paper, and to publicly solicit aid for runaway slaves.  Because of the Fugitive Slave Act, these trips included significant risk to Shadd's well-being; free blacks could be captured by bounty hunters seeking escaped slaves.

As was typical in the black press, The Provincial Freeman played an important role by giving voice to the opinions of black Canadian anti-slavery activists.

The impact of African-American newspapers from 1850 to 1860 was significant in the abolitionist movement. However, it was challenging to sustain publication. Publishers like Shadd undertook their work because of a commitment to education and advocacy and used their newspapers as a means to influence opinion. They had to overcome financial, political, and social challenges to keep their papers afloat.

Carol B. Conaway writes in "Racial Uplift: The Nineteenth Century Thought of Black Newspaper Publisher Mary Ann Shadd Cary" that these newspapers shifted the focus from whites to blacks in an empowering way. She writes that whites read these newspapers to monitor the dissatisfaction level of the treatment of African Americans and to measure their tolerance for continued slavery in America.

Black newspapers often modeled their newspapers on mainstream white publications. According to research conducted by William David Sloan in his various historical textbooks, the first newspapers were about four pages and had one blank page to provide a place for people to write their own information before passing it along to friends and relatives.  He goes even further to discuss how the newspapers during these early days were the center of information for society and culture.

In 1854, Shadd changed the masthead to feature her own name, rather than McArthur and Ward.  She also hired her sister to help edit the paper.  There was intense criticism of the change, and Shadd was forced to resign the following year.

Civil War and postbellum activism

Between 1855 and 1856, Shadd traveled in the United States as an anti-slavery speaker, advocating for full racial integration through education and self-reliance. In her speeches, she advised all blacks to insist on fair treatment and if all else failed, to take legal action.

She sought to participate in the 1855 Philadelphia Colored Convention, but women had never been permitted to attend, and the assembly had to debate whether to let her sit as a delegate. Her advocacy of emigration made her a controversial figure and she was only admitted by a slim margin of 15 votes. According to Frederick Douglass's Paper, although she gave a speech at the Convention advocating for emigration, she was so well-received that the delegates voted to give her ten more minutes to speak. However, her presence at the convention was largely elided from the minutes, likely because she was a woman.

In 1856, she married Thomas F. Cary, a Toronto barber who was also involved with the Provincial Freeman. She had a daughter named Sarah and a son named Linton.

In 1858, she was a member of the Chatham Vigilance Committee that sought to prevent former slaves from being returned to the United States and brought back into slavery, such as the case of Sylvanus Demarest.

After her husband died in 1860, Shadd Cary and her children returned to the United States. During the Civil War, at the behest of the abolitionist Martin Delany, she served as a recruiting officer to enlist black volunteers for the Union Army in the state of Indiana.

After the Civil War, she taught in black schools in Wilmington.  She then returned to Washington, D.C., with her daughter, and taught for fifteen years in the public schools. She then attended Howard University School of Law and graduated at the age of 60 in 1883, becoming only the second black woman in the United States to earn a law degree.

She wrote for the newspapers  National Era and The People's Advocate and in 1880, organized the Colored Women's Progressive Franchise.

Shadd Cary joined the National Woman Suffrage Association, working alongside Susan B. Anthony and Elizabeth Cady Stanton for women's suffrage, testifying before the Judiciary Committee of the House of Representatives, and becoming the first African-American woman to vote in a national election.

She died in Washington, D.C., on June 5, 1893, from stomach cancer. She was interred at Columbian Harmony Cemetery.

Legacy
In the United States, Shadd Cary's former residence in the U Street Corridor of Washington, DC, was declared a National Historic Landmark in 1976. In 1987 she was designated a Women's History Month Honoree by the National Women's History Project. In 1998, Shadd Cary was inducted into the National Women's Hall of Fame.

In Canada, she was designated a Person of National Historic Significance, with a plaque from the National Historic Sites and Monuments Board placed in Chatham, Ontario. There, at BME Freedom Park, Ontario provincial plaques also honor her and her newspaper, The Provincial Freeman. In Toronto, a Heritage Toronto plaque marks where she published the Provincial Freeman while living in the city from 1854 to 1855.

Shadd Cary is featured in Canada's citizenship test study guide, released in 2009.

In 1985 Mary Shadd Public School was opened in Scarborough Ontario Canada, in the town of Malvern, and was later enlarged in 1992. The school motto "Free to be...the best of me" and school anthem "We're on the right track...Mary Shadd" are tributes to Shadd, after whom the school was named.

In 2018 the New York Times published a belated obituary for her.

Shadd's 197th birthday was observed with a Google Doodle on October 9, 2020, appearing across Canada, the United States, Latvia, Senegal, Ghana, Nigeria, Kenya, Tanzania, and South Africa.

The Mary Ann Shadd Cary Post Office, named that in 2021, is at 500 Delaware Avenue, Suite 1, in Wilmington, Delaware.

On May 12, 2022, the University of Windsor in Ontario, Canada unveiled a bronze statue of Mary Ann Shadd Cary created by local artist Donna Mayne. Members of the Shadd family and descendants attended the unveiling.

Archives 
There is a Mary Ann Shadd Cary collection at Library and Archives Canada. The archival reference number is R4182, former archival reference number MG24-K22. The collection covers the date range 1852 to 1889. It consists of 1.6 centimeters of textual records, and 1 photograph.

See also

 African American history
 African American literature
 List of African-American abolitionists
 List of African American writers
 Eunice P. Shadd
Isaac Shadd

References

Further reading

External links

 Biography at the Dictionary of Canadian Biography Online
 
 Biography from the site of Professor Scott Williams of the University of Buffalo
 
 
 Abolitionist Newspapers of Ontario: The Provincial Freeman and Voice of the Fugitive

1823 births
1893 deaths
19th-century American journalists
19th-century American newspaper founders
19th-century American newspaper publishers (people)
19th-century American women writers
19th-century Canadian newspaper publishers (people)
19th-century American businesswomen
19th-century American businesspeople
African-American abolitionists
African-American company founders
African-American educators
African-American feminists
African-American lawyers
African-American publishers (people)
African-American suffragists
African-American women lawyers
African-American writers
American company founders
American educators
American emigrants to pre-Confederation Ontario
American feminists
American people of German descent
American publishers (people)
American suffragists
19th-century American women lawyers
American women non-fiction writers
Black Canadian activists
Black Canadian women
Black Canadian writers
Burials at Columbian Harmony Cemetery
Canadian people of African-American descent
Canadian people of German descent
Colored Conventions people
Howard University School of Law alumni
Journalists from Delaware
Journalists from Washington, D.C.
Lawyers from Washington, D.C.
Persons of National Historic Significance (Canada)
American women company founders
Women in the American Civil War
Writers from Wilmington, Delaware
Canadian women company founders
19th-century American lawyers
Women civil rights activists
Roman Catholic activists
Canadian civil rights lawyers
Black Canadian lawyers
19th-century African-American writers
19th-century African-American women writers